Abilene Christian Wildcats (variously ACU or ACU Wildcats) refers to the sports teams of Abilene Christian University located in Abilene, Texas. The Wildcats joined the Western Athletic Conference (WAC) on July 1, 2021 after having spent the previous eight years in the Southland Conference. The nickname "Wildcat" is derived from the mascot of the team.

Sports sponsored

History
A member of the Western Athletic Conference, Abilene Christian sponsors teams in seven men's and eight women's NCAA sanctioned sports.

On July 1, 2013, Abilene Christian returned to the Southland Conference as one of four new members. The university, a charter member of the Southland Conference, left the Southland in 1973 to join the Lone Star Conference (LSC) of NCAA Division II. The Wildcats remained members of the Lone Star Conference from 1973 until returning to the Southland Conference in 2013.

Overall, the Wildcats have won a combined 62 team national championships, including 57 as a member of the NCAA trailing behind UCLA, Stanford, USC and Kenyon College for the most NCAA team championships.

In 2007, the LSC included 33 ACU current and former student athletes in its 75-member all-sports team commemorating the conference's 75th anniversary.

On August 23, 2017 the NCAA Board of Directors voted to pass ACU through to full Division I status, thus making them eligible for postseason play.

On January 14, 2021, ACU was one of five institutions announced as future members of the Western Athletic Conference (WAC), alongside three other Southland members from Texas (Lamar, Sam Houston, Stephen F. Austin) plus Big Sky Conference member Southern Utah. Initially, all five schools were to join in July 2022, but the entry of ACU and the other Texas schools was moved to 2021 after the Southland expelled its departing members.

Conference affiliation history
 1963–64 to 1972–73 – Southland Conference
 1973–74 to 2012–13 – Lone Star Conference
 2013–14 to 2020–21 – Southland Conference
 2021 to Present – Western Athletic Conference

Championships

National championships

Conference championships

Lone Star Conference

Notable non-varsity sports 
ACU currently has club sports in Men's Lacrosse, Men's Rugby, Men's Soccer, and Co-Ed Golf.  ACU Athletics took over all club sports on the ACU campus in January 2017 and named Todd Rogers as the Director of Club Sports, who oversees all 4 sports.  Todd is an Abilene native and a December 2016 graduate of Texas Tech University.  As the Director of Club Sports, Rogers will oversee the university's nationally competitive program with the hopes of driving enrollment and adding more club sports in the future.

ACU athletes in halls of fame
College Football – Wilbert Montgomery (1996).

Drake Relays – Bobby Morrow, (1959).

Lone Star Conference – Wilbert Montgomery, football (1996); Billy Olson, men's track and field (1997); Wally Bullington, football (1999); Wes Kittley, track and field (2006).

U.S. Olympic – Bobby Morrow, men's track and field (1989).

Texas Sports – Bobby Morrow (1960), Tonto Coleman (1983), Eck Curtis (1985).

U.S. Track and Field – Bobby Morrow (1975)

WWE – John Layfield (2020; played football at ACU)

Media
All Abilene Christian athletics are broadcast on ESPN+ and KHXS.

References

External links